Antonio "Toni" Herreros Angrill (born August 24, 1972 in Ponts) is a Spanish slalom canoer who competed from the early 1990s to the mid-2000s (decade). Competing in two Summer Olympics, he earned his best finish of 10th in the C-2 event in Sydney in 2000.

External links
 Sports-Reference.com profile

1972 births
Canoeists at the 1996 Summer Olympics
Canoeists at the 2000 Summer Olympics
Living people
Olympic canoeists of Spain
Spanish male canoeists
Sportspeople from the Province of Lleida
People from Noguera (comarca)